Columnar (or epithelium) is a type of epithelial cell.

Columnar may also refer to:
Columnar cacti, a descriptive term for smaller cacti
Columnar database, a type of database which stores data tables by column rather than by row
Columnar disposition, a technique in encryption 
Columnar jointing, a geological structure shaped as a regular array of polygonal prisms
Columnar basalt, a type of rock formed during the cooling of a thick lava flow
Columnar Peak, a subsidiary peak of Mount Garibaldi, British Columbia, Canada
Columnar phase, a class of floating crystals which can exist in a cylindrical shape
Columnar Valley, a valley in Victoria Land, eastern Antarctica

See also
Column (disambiguation)
Columnaria, an extinct genus of rugose coral
Columnarios, silver coins that were minted by Spain from 1732 to 1773
Columnaris, a symptom of disease in fish caused by the Flavobacterium columnare bacterium